Ostrowice  (formerly German Wusterwitz) is a village in Drawsko County, West Pomeranian Voivodeship, in north-western Poland. Until January 1, 2019, it was the seat of the gmina (administrative district) called Gmina Ostrowice that was created after the Second World War but divided on January 1, 2019, between the administrative districts of Zlocieniec and Drawsko Pomorskie because of high debts.

For the history of the region, see History of Pomerania.

The village has a population of 540.

References

Ostrowice